Butlers Gorge is a rural locality in the local government area of Central Highlands in the Central region of Tasmania. The 2016 census determined a population of nil for the state suburb of Butlers Gorge.

History
Butlers Gorge was gazetted as a locality in 1971. It was named for John Leslie Butler, a surveyor who worked in the area.

Geography
Most of Lake King William is contained within the locality. The River Derwent flows from the lake to the south-east boundary.

Climate
Butlers Gorge has a temperate oceanic climate (Köppen: Cfb), bordering on a subpolar oceanic climate (Köppen: Cfc). Over the period 1957 to 1993, there were on average 27 snow days annually.

Road infrastructure
The C603 route (Butlers Gorge Road) enters from the south-east and terminates at the Lake King William Dam.

See also
 Butlers Gorge Power Station

References

Localities of Central Highlands Council
Towns in Tasmania